The CHondritic Uniform Reservoir or CHUR is a scientific model in astrophysics and geochemistry for the mean chemical composition of the part of the Solar Nebula from which, during the formation of the Solar System, chondrites formed. This hypothetical chemical reservoir is thought to have been similar in composition to the current photosphere of the Sun.

When the Sun formed from its protostar, around 4.56 billion years ago, the solar wind blew all gas particles from the central part of the Solar Nebula. In this way most lighter volatiles (e.g. hydrogen, helium, oxygen, carbon dioxide), that had not yet condensed in the inner, warmer regions of the nebula, were lost. This fractionation process is the reason why the terrestrial planets and asteroid belt are relatively enriched in heavy elements in respect to the Sun or the gas planets.

Certain type of meteorites, CI-chondrites, have chemical compositions that are almost identical to the solar photosphere, except for the abundances of volatiles. Because the Sun contains 99.86% of the mass of the Solar System, they are considered to have the same composition as the solar nebula (with the exception of volatile loss) and are therefore representative of the material from which the terrestrial planets, including the Earth, were formed.

See also
Chondrite
Nebular hypothesis

Astrophysics
Geochemistry